Murilo Oliveira de Freitas (born 12 May 1996) is a Brazilian footballer who plays for Chapecoense.

Club career
On 7 August 2019, he joined Primeira Liga club Paços de Ferreira for the 2019–20 season.

On 1 July 2021, he signed with Varzim.

On 6 January 2023, Murilo joined Chapecoense on a contract until 30 November 2023.

References

1996 births
People from São José do Rio Preto
Footballers from São Paulo (state)
Living people
Brazilian footballers
Association football wingers
Mirassol Futebol Clube players
C.D. Tondela players
Rio Ave F.C. players
F.C. Paços de Ferreira players
G.D. Estoril Praia players
Varzim S.C. players
Associação Chapecoense de Futebol players
Primeira Liga players
Liga Portugal 2 players
Campeonato Catarinense players
Brazilian expatriate footballers
Expatriate footballers in Portugal
Brazilian expatriate sportspeople in Portugal